60 Aquarii is a star located 375 light years away from the Sun in the equatorial constellation of Aquarius. 60 Aquarii is its Flamsteed designation. It is visible to the naked eye as a dim, yellow-hued star with an apparent visual magnitude of 5.89. The star is moving closer to the Earth with a heliocentric radial velocity of –8 km/s.

This is an aging giant star with a stellar classification of G6 III, most likely on the horizontal branch. It is 437 million years old with 2.77 times the mass of the Sun. Having exhausted the hydrogen at its core, this star has evolved away from the main sequence and expanded to 11 times the Sun's radius. It is radiating 65 times the luminosity of the Sun from its swollen photosphere at an effective temperature of 4,820 K.

A magnitude 11.54 companion star is located at an angular separation of  along a position angle of 299°, as of 2013.

References

External links
 Image 60 Aquarii

G-type giants
Horizontal-branch stars
Aquarius (constellation)
Durchmusterung objects
Aquarii, 060
213789
111394
8590